Tariq Goddard (born 1975) is a British novelist and publisher. He has written six novels, the first of which Homage to a Firing Squad, was short-listed for the Whitbread Book Award for First Novel. His first three novels were published by Sceptre. In 2007, he founded the independent publishing company, Zero Books, and is now the publisher of Repeater Books.

Life and career
Goddard was born in London and read philosophy at King's College, London, and Continental Philosophy at the University of Warwick and the University of Surrey.  In 2002 his first novel, Homage to a Firing Squad, was nominated for the Whitbread (Costa) Book Award for First Novel. It was also nominated for the  Bollinger Everyman Wodehouse Prize literary award for comic literature.  He was included as one of Waterstones' 'Faces of the Future' and the novel, whose film rights where sold, was listed as one of The Observer'''s Four Debuts of the year.

In 2003 his second novel, Dynamo, was cited as one of the ten best sports novels of all time by The Observer Sports Magazine.  The Morning Rides Behind Us, his third novel, was released in 2005, and short-listed for the Commonwealth Writers Prize for Fiction.  In 2010 The Picture of Contented New Wealth, his fourth novel, won The Independent Publishers Award for Horror Writing and he was awarded a development grant by The Royal Literary Fund.  The Message, published in 2011 and set in a fictional African state, received Silver at the 2012 Independent Publishers Award for Literary Fiction. His sixth novel Nature and Necessity was published in 2017. The Repeater Book of the Occult, edited by Tariq Goddard and “horror philosopher” Eugene Thacker, was published in 2021. Goddard is a frequent contributor to The Quietus, and has written an opinion piece "Why Music Journalism is Important."

In 2007 Goddard began the imprint Zero Books. In 2014 he and his co-founders left Zero Books and started Repeater Books. He lives on a farm in Wiltshire with his wife and two sons.

BibliographyHomage to a Firing Squad. Sceptre Books, 2003. .Dynamo. Sceptre Books, 2004. .The Morning Rides Behind Us. Sceptre Books, 2006. .The Message. Zero Books, 2011. .The Picture of Contented New Wealth: A Metaphysical Horror. Zero Books, 2009. .Nature and Necessity. Repeater Books, 2017. .The Repeater Book of the Occult. Edited with Eugene Thacker. Repeater Books, 2021. .The Repeater Book of Heroism. Edited with Alex Niven. Repeater Books, 2022. .High John the Conqueror''. Repeater Books, 2022. .

References

External links

Audio interview with Tariq Goddard (BBC Radio 4)
Excerpt from The Picture of Contented New Wealth
What Was Possible - Tariq Goddard on Outsider Publishing and Capitalist Realism Today, The Point (29 March 2019).
Low Culture Podcast: Tariq Goddard on the Sisters of Mercy, The Quietus (1 October 2020).

1975 births
Living people
Alumni of King's College London
Alumni of the University of Surrey
21st-century British novelists
British publishers (people)